Yangxi is a town in Daozhen Gelao and Miao Autonomous County, Guizhou, China.

Administrative division
As of 2016, the town is divided into four villages: 
 Yangxi
 Siping
 Longtai
 Yangba

Geography

Economy
The economy is supported primarily by farming and ranching. The main cash crop is medicinal materials.

References

Bibliography

Towns of Zunyi